The Tashkent Polytechnical Museum is an automotive museum in Tashkent, Uzbekistan. The museum provides technical and mechanical information about cars made from 1800 to 1900, focusing on the history of automobile technology and production in Uzbekistan and around the world. It is located in the Mirabad district of Tashkent.

History 
The Tashkent Polytechnical Museum was established on 10 November 2015.

Exhibits 
In the very center of Tashkent, just a 5-minute walk from Amir Timur Square, there is Tashkent Polytechnic Museum. This is a unique museum for Uzbekistan, and also one of the newest - its opening took place in November 2015. Its exposition can be divided into two parts: the automotive industry and the natural sciences.

The Museum's main building holds four areas, The History of the World's Automobile Construction, The History of Automobile Technologies in Uzbekistan, Interactive Practice and Kids Land.

The History of the World's Automobile Construction 
This area provides visitors with information on the invention of the wheel and the first car. One display is devoted to the automobile industry in the late 1950s and an exhibition on the development of agricultural machinery that recounts the history of agricultural development in Uzbekistan in chronological order, from simple agricultural tools to large machinery, such as tractors. Some of the other displays include Ford Zone (1924), Universal (1934), Axos-34, GAZ-13 and Moskvich-400.

The History of Automobile Technologies in Uzbekistan 
This exhibition highlights notable periods in automobile history. The exhibition centers around the Spark Car, which was produced in Uzbekistan in cooperation with General Motors. An original Spark Car is displayed. Many of the tools used in automobile manufacturing are on display including the 3D mapping technology used to develop the Spark Car.

Interactive Practice 
The Interactive Practice area allows visitors to test and use some of the tools on display. One component to this section is the "Illusion Room" where visitors can enter a maze of mirrors that create the illusion of walking on the ceiling, growing and shrinking in size.

Kids Land 
Kids Land was built for young visitors. It includes a ball pit, climbing components and educational cartoons.

See also 

 State Museum of History of Uzbekistan
 The Museum of Health Care of Uzbekistan
 The Museum of Communication History in Uzbekistan
 Museum of Arts of Uzbekistan
 Tashkent Museum of Railway Techniques
 Museum of Geology, Tashkent
 Art Gallery of Uzbekistan
 The Alisher Navoi State Museum of Literature
 Museum of Victims of Political Repression in Tashkent
 State Museum of Nature of Uzbekistan

References 

Museums in Tashkent
Automotive museums